Brad Bigler is an American college basketball coach, currently the head coach of the Southwest Minnesota State Mustangs.

Bigler is a native of Fort Madison, Iowa. From 1997 to 2002, he was a member of the Southwest Minnesota State basketball team. He finished with 286 career assists, which is currently the seventh most in school history. He also helped the Mustangs accumulate a record of 83-36 and win the North Central Region championship in 2001.

After his playing days were done, Bigler began his coaching career as the head women's basketball coach at Lakeview High School in Cottonwood, Minnesota. He coached there for one year.

In 2003, he went back to Southwest Minnesota State as a graduate assistant. In 2005, he was hired as a full time assistant. During his years an assistant, the Mustangs won a NSIC conference championship and an NCAA regional championship.

In 2009, Bigler was hired as the head coach of Southwest Minnesota State. In his first season, the Mustangs went 17-12 (10-10 conference) and finished 6th in the conference. In 2012, they won the NSIC tournament for the first time in school history. In 2017, the Mustangs won their second ever NSIC Tournament championship advanced to the regional championship game before losing to eventual national champion Northwest Missouri State. During the 2016–17 and 2017–18 seasons, the Mustangs won back-to-back NSIC South Division championships.

Head Coaching Record

References

Southwest Minnesota State Mustangs men's basketball coaches
Basketball coaches from Iowa
Southwest Minnesota State University alumni
Living people
Year of birth missing (living people)